The Seven Wonders of Wales is a traditional list of notable landmarks in north Wales, commemorated in an anonymously written rhyme:

The rhyme is usually supposed to have been written sometime in the late 18th or early 19th century by an English visitor to North Wales. The specific number of wonders may have varied over the years: the antiquary Daines Barrington, in a letter written in 1770, refers to Llangollen Bridge as one of the "five wonders of Wales, though like the seven wonders of Dauphiny, they turn out to be no wonders at all out of the Principality".  

The seven wonders comprise:

See also
 Seven Natural Wonders of the UK
 Seven Wonders of the World

Notes and references 

Wales
Tourist attractions in Wales
Landmarks in Wales